Gregory Bright (born 1954) is a New Orleans native who was convicted of second-degree murder in 1974 at the age of 20. He was sentenced to life without parole, served at the Louisiana State Penitentiary. After several years of appeals, Mr. Bright was granted a new trial in 2001 on the grounds that the prosecution had withheld evidence from the defense in his previous trial. On June 24, 2003, after 27 ½ years in prison for a crime they did not commit, Mr. Bright and Earl Truvia were both released after the Orleans Parish district attorney dismissed all charges. When Bright was released from prison, the State of Louisiana only provided a US$10 check and garbage bags full of legal paperwork.

Bright speaks around the country about his wrongful incarceration and life since prison. He can also be seen on HBO's Tremé, the third season of FX's American Horror Story and TNT's Memphis Beat.

Innocence Project New Orleans 
In 2010, Mr. Bright joined Innocence Project New Orleans as Assistant Education and Outreach Director.

Never Fight a Shark in Water 
Lara Naughton and Gregory Bright collaborated on a documentary play based on Bright's words and recollections that exposes the failure of the criminal justice system, life in prison, and Bright's journey to freedom and forgiveness. With its first showing in 2010, the play is now performed by Bright himself under Naughton's direction.

See also
 List of wrongful convictions in the United States

Notes

External links 
Video: Gregory Bright on campus . Media presentation on LSU Reveille campus regarding Bright's conviction and sentence
Gregory Bright: A real crime: Wrongfully convicted. Editorial by Gregory Bright regarding Conviction (2010 film) and his own account of wrongful convictions. Star Tribune, October 24, 2010.
Hopes for 2006: Gregory Bright. Radio Interview with Gregory Bright. All Things Considered. NPR, December 31, 2005.
Innocence Project New Orleans: Gregory Bright and Earl Truvia. Information provided by the non-profit that accepted Bright's case in 2001

Living people
Louisiana State Penitentiary
Overturned convictions in the United States
Prisoners sentenced to life imprisonment by Louisiana
American prisoners sentenced to life imprisonment
American people wrongfully convicted of murder
1954 births